The Jingda Expressway is an expressway in the People's Republic of China, starting from Beijing and ending in Datong, in Shanxi province. It is 334 km in length and was completed in full on November 16, 2002.

The Jingda Expressway is formed mainly by the main trunk route from Beijing to Datong in three stages. Leaving Beijing, the Jingda Expressway becomes the Badaling Expressway. After Kangzhuang in Yanqing County, it becomes the Jingzhang Expressway. Finally, it becomes the Xuanda Expressway.

As of September 2004, traffic has been clogging up more and more in the area. Due to the massive transportation of coal, what was a very smooth route in the summer is now clogged up with immense traffic jams.

Specific Information
 For the beginning section in Beijing through to Kangzhuang, see Badaling Expressway.
 For the section from Kangzhuang, Beijing through to Xuanhua, Hebei, see Jingzhang Expressway.
 For the section from Xuanhua through to Datong, Shanxi, see Xuanda Expressway.

See also
 China National Highways 
 Expressways of Beijing 
 Expressways of China 

Expressways in China
Road transport in Beijing
Transport in Shanxi